Sybil Morgan, known as Mrs E.L. Morgan, (1898 – 5 April 1983) was a British philatelist who was added to the Roll of Distinguished Philatelists in 1976.

Morgan was a specialist in Welsh postal history, campaign covers to 1914, the cachets of forwarding agents, and Swiss airmails.

Selected publications
The Postal History of Cardiff. (With Michael Scott-Archer)

References

Signatories to the Roll of Distinguished Philatelists
1898 births
1983 deaths
British philatelists
Fellows of the Royal Philatelic Society London
Women philatelists